USS McDougal may refer to one of several United States Navy ships named in honor of David Stockton McDougal:

United States Navy ship names